Cordylus niger, the black girdled lizard, is a medium-sized lizard restricted to Table Mountain on the Cape Peninsula and a second, isolated population near Langebaan.

Black girdled lizards inhabit rocky outcrops on Table Mountain, South Africa. Unlike many other lizard species in the area, these particular Cordylus lizards are not social and are usually seen alone. They are spiny, flat, and pitch black in colour.

Their colour helps these unique lizards to absorb sufficient heat from the sun, in what is one of the darkest, least sunny parts of South Africa.

Gallery

References

Further reading
 Branch, B., 1998. Field Guide to Snakes and other Reptiles of Southern Africa: Ralph Curtis Books Publishing, Sanibel Island, Florida, 399 p.
 Fitzsimons, V. F., 1943. The Lizards of South Africa: Transvaal Museum Memoir, Pretoria.

Cordylus
Reptiles of South Africa
Reptiles described in 1844
Taxa named by Andrew Smith (zoologist)